The 2009 G20 London Summit was the second meeting of the G20 heads of government/heads of state, which was held in London on 2 April 2009 at the ExCeL Exhibition Centre to discuss financial markets and the world economy. It followed the first G20 Leaders Summit on Financial Markets and the World Economy, which was held in Washington, D.C. on 14–15 November 2008. Heads of government or heads of state from the G20 attended, with some regional and international organisations also represented. Due to the extended membership, it has been referred to as the London Summit.

The policing tactics at the event raised some controversy, particularly over the death of Ian Tomlinson.

It was revealed in June 2013 that the Government Communications Headquarters, an intelligence agency of the British government, had intercepted phone calls and monitored computers used by foreign delegates at the summit. Their actions were sanctioned by the British government, and intelligence was passed to British government ministers.

Agenda
As hosts, the British Treasury produced an extended agenda pamphlet proposing the issues to be addressed at the London Summit. The explicit goal was "to start the process of reform so as to manage globalisation as a force for good in the medium term."
 Engaging concerted action to counter falling demand and fragile confidence (although different countries have different room for manoeuvre on monetary policy)
 Developing joint actions to prevent further contagion and support vulnerable emerging and developing markets
 Working together to address the flaws in the financial and supervisory architecture that crisis has exposed
 Strengthening cross-border co-ordination of financial regulation and international financial institutions like the Financial Stability Forum (FSF) and the International Monetary Fund (IMF)
 Agreeing to boost world trade and reject protectionism as a way of moving towards more stable and secure global commodities markets
 Reaffirming our shared commitment to meet the Millennium Development Goals

Preparation
Leaders of the member countries began to prepare for the London Summit months before the effective date, notably with two official meetings dedicated to that preparation, one held in Berlin, Germany, on 22 February 2009 for European leaders, and another in Horsham, Sussex, United Kingdom, on 14 March 2009 for Finance Ministers.

European leaders summit
Leaders of the four European Union member countries of the G20, the United Kingdom, Germany, France and Italy along with the two largest European non-members, Spain and the Netherlands, met in Berlin on 22 February 2009 to prepare for the London Summit and to co-ordinate their actions. The meeting was organised at the initiative of German Chancellor Angela Merkel.

The leaders agreed that markets, financial institutions and the wide range of financial assets they create, and hedge funds should be subject to appropriate control. In addition, they called for effective sanctions against tax havens. They also agreed to impose sanctions against countries that intend to undermine their work. Finally, they advocated the doubling of funds available to the IMF.

Finance ministers summit
Finance ministers and central bankers of the G20 met in Horsham on 14 March 2009 to prepare for the London Summit. To restore global growth as quickly as possible, the participants decided to approve coordinated and decisive actions to stimulate demand and employment. They also pledged to fight against all forms of protectionism and to maintain trade and foreign investments.

The members also committed themselves to maintain the supply of credit by providing more liquidity and recapitalising the banking system, and to implement rapidly the stimulus plans. As for central bankers, they pledged to maintain low-rates policies as long as necessary. Finally, the leaders decided to help emerging and developing countries, through a strengthening of the IMF.

To strengthen the financial system, the participants proposed to regulate appropriately all important financial institutions, to register all hedge funds or their managers and to force them to provide appropriate information as to the risks they take. They proposed to implement regulation to prevent the systemic risks and to curb business cycles, including the limitation of the leverage effect, which amplifies cycles. They announced new measures to prevent and resolve crises, through the strengthening of the IMF and the FSF. They agreed to control credit-rating agencies and their compliance with the Code of Conduct of the International Organization of Securities Commissions; off-balance-sheet vehicles; credit-derivatives market; and non-cooperative territories.

Gordon Brown's pre-summit meetings
In the weeks before the London Summit, UK Prime Minister Gordon Brown visited several countries on three continents to try to secure backing for his goals at the London Summit. During the trip Brown was forced to re-clarify his position on fiscal stimulus after criticism from the Governor of the Bank of England. While speaking at the European Parliament in Strasbourg, France, he was challenged by a Member of the European Parliament over his spending plans. He also visited the US, Brazil, Argentina and Chile. He strongly attacked protectionism saying "One of the messages that must come from next week's summit is that we will reject protectionist countries, we will monitor those countries and name and shame if necessary countries that are not following free trade practices".

In the weeks leading up to the London Summit, there had been a growing difference of opinions on the question of implementing further fiscal stimulus. The British and the American leaderships were in favour of another round of stimulus packages to try to stimulate the global economy, while the French and German leaderships remained strongly opposed to such measures because of the increased levels of debt which this would cause. On 26 March 2009 the Czech Prime Minister Mirek Topolanek strongly criticised the economic expansion policies of US President Barack Obama.

Attendance

G20 leaders began gathering in London on 1 April 2009. Before leaving for the London Summit, French President Nicolas Sarkozy suggested that if a meaningful deal was not agreed France would walk out of the summit echoing the "empty chair" gesture of then-French President Charles de Gaulle in 1965. At a joint press conference in London, Brown and Obama said that suggestions of a rift were exaggerated. Sarkozy attended a separate press conference with Merkel in which both repeated calls for the summit to agree on more stringent regulation of financial markets and restated their firm opposition to further financial stimulus packages.

On the evening of 1 April the leaders attended a reception at Buckingham Palace hosted by Elizabeth II. During a photograph she lightly rebuked the Italian Prime Minister Silvio Berlusconi for shouting too loudly in an effort to attract the attention of President Obama. The story was featured heavily in the Italian media, and was used by opponents to lambast Berlusconi. After the palace reception, the leaders dined at 10 Downing Street where the food was cooked by Jamie Oliver.

The summit proper began on the morning of 2 April and took place at the Excel Centre in Custom House, east London.

Core participants
The following participants of the London summit include the core members of the G20, which comprises 19 countries and the European Union which is represented by its two governing bodies, the European Council and the European Commission, as well as other nations and regional organisations invited to take part.

Security operation
The security operation, Operation Glencoe headed by Commander Bob Broadhurst, was projected to cost £7.2 million.
Six police forces were used during the operation: the Metropolitan Police, the City of London Police, British Transport Police and the forces of Essex Police, Sussex Police and Bedfordshire Police. Furthermore, some units from the Ministry of Defence Police have been used. It is the highest security expenditure in British history.

GCHQ interception of foreign politicians communications
In June 2013 The Guardian revealed that the intelligence agency of the British government, Government Communications Headquarters (GCHQ) spied on foreign politicians visiting the summit by intercepting phonecalls, emails and monitoring computers, in some cases even ongoing after the summit via keyloggers that had been installed during the summit.

Protests

The summit became the focus of protests from a number of disparate groups over various long standing and topical issues. These ranged from disquiet over economic policy, anger at the banking system and bankers remuneration and bonuses, the continued war on terror and concerns over climate change. Although the majority of the protests and protestors were peaceful, instances of violence and criminal damage led to the use of kettling to contain protestors.

Death of Ian Tomlinson

Ian Tomlinson, a newsagent in the City of London, died within a police cordon of the G20 Meltdown protest near the Bank of England. Initially the City of London Police denied that any incident with the police had occurred. However video, photographic and eyewitness evidence was published in the media, and the Independent Police Complaints Commission (IPCC) confirmed that Tomlinson had been pushed back by police officers minutes before he collapsed and died of a heart attack. Further allegations that Tomlinson had been hit with a baton were supported when additional video footage became public. The IPCC then later ordered a second post mortem and an independent criminal inquiry, with the second post mortem finding that although "there is evidence of coronary atherosclerosis" it was "unlikely to have contributed to the cause of death" and that "the cause of death was abdominal haemorrhage".

Outcome
The London summit was a preliminary step in the process through which the G20 evolved to become "the premier forum for discussing, planning and monitoring international economic
co-operation".

Financial commitments
The G20 leaders reached an agreement which, in principle, provides US$1.1 trillion to various programs designed to improve international finance, credit, trade, and overall economic stability and recovery. There was some dispute about how best to move forward. On one hand, the UK and the US wanted a large financial stimulus. On the other hand, France and Germany wanted stricter financial regulation. Programs include:
 US$500 billion increase in the resources pledged by members to the New Arrangements to Borrow, a facility for the IMF to lend money to struggling economies,
 US$250 billion in pledges to increase trade finance,
 US$250 billion allocation of special drawing rights (SDR) which give IMF members the right to drawn down foreign currency in a crisis,
 US$100 billion in commitments for the multilateral development banks to lend to poor countries.

Regulation
An agreement was also reached to attempt to bring wider global regulation of hedge funds and credit-rating agencies, a common approach to cleaning up bank toxic assets. The G20 leaders also agreed to establish a financial stability forum working with the IMF to ensure wider global co-operation and to provide an early-warning system for future financial crises.

No green policies
Despite calls for a green new deal from Greenpeace and others and general political hype regarding environmental concerns, none of the US$1.1 trillion stimulus package was allocated for environmental investment, and no other environmental agreements were made.

Decreased influence of the United States
One of the general agreements at the London Summit is that there needs to be more government regulations over businesses, and there was a perception that the US would no longer be as dominant as it has been previously. Commenting on the summit, Robert Hormats, vice-chairman of Goldman Sachs International, said "The U.S. is becoming less dominant while other nations are gaining influence."

Influence of China
The influence of China was very apparent during the G20 with some commentators saying that the G20 was more like a G2.

See also
 G20
 List of G20 summits

Notes

References
 Great Britain Cabinet Office. (2008). Managing the Global Economy Through Turbulent Times. London: HM Treasury. ;  OCLC 428643726

External links
*] G20 Information Centre
 Graphic: G20 is not simply the 20 largest economies

 News coverage from the BBC, news.bbc.co.uk
 News coverage from the Financial Times, ft.com
 News coverage from The Guardian, guardian.co.uk
 News coverage from Radio France Internationale, rfi.fr
 News coverage from The Daily Telegraph, telegraph.co.uk
 Tracking the London Summit 2009 blog from The Centre for International Governance Innovation and Chatham House, g20london.wordpress.com
 The G-20: A City Survival Guide by Parmy Olson, Forbes, 30 March 2009. forbes.com

2009 in economics
2009 in London
2009,03,London
Diplomatic conferences in the United Kingdom
21st-century diplomatic conferences (Global)
2009 in international relations
2009 conferences
April 2009 events in the United Kingdom
Events in London